Quo Vadis is a cycle of poems for chorus and orchestra in nine movements, composed between 1936 and 1945 by George Dyson. It has been described as an "anthology cantata", where poems from more than one author are used to explore a subject - in this case 'where are you going?' (the literal translation of the Latin phrase "quo vadis". Christopher Palmer summed up the work's theme as "man’s earthly pilgrimage, his spiritual odyssey and its consummation in Shelley’s 'white radiance of Eternity'"

What we now know as part one was originally intended for the Three Choirs Festival on 7 September 1939, but the performance was cancelled when war was declared on 1 September. The first complete performance eventually took place in Hereford at the 1949 Festival. Lewis Foreman related the work to a movement he termed "agnostics at prayer", including other choral compositions of the period such as Sancta Civitas (Vaughan Williams, 1925), Hymnus Paradisi (Howells, 1938), Intimations of Immortality  (Finzi, 1950), and Amore Langueo (Ferguson, 1955-56).

Quo Vadis is to be revived at the Three Choirs Festival in Hereford on 25 July, 2022.

Sections
Our birth is but a sleep - chorus - William Wordsworth
Rise O my Soul - alto and semi-chorus - Sir Walter Raleigh; Thomas Campion; Thomas Heywood 
Whither shall my troubled muse incline - bass and chorus - Barnaby Barnes; Robert Herrick; Thomas Lynch; Thomas Sternhold
Night hath no wings - tenor, solo viola and semi-chorus - Robert Herrick; Isaac Williams 
Timely happy, timely wise - solo quartet, chorus, semi-chorus - John Keble 
Dear stream, dear bank - soprano - Henry Vaughan; George Herbert 
Come to me God - bass solo and chorus - Robert Herrick; Henry Vaughan 
They are at rest - alto and quartet - John Henry Newman 
To find the Western path - tenor, quartet and chorus - William Blake; Percy Bysshe Shelley; Salisbury Diurnal

References

Oratorios
Compositions by George Dyson
1945 compositions